Edvin Sugarev (Bulgarian: Едвин Сугарев), (born 27 December 1953) in Sofia, is a Bulgarian poet and politician. He graduated from Sofia University in 1979. He was one of the founders of the first democratic movement in Bulgaria, "Ecoglasnost" and later appointed ambassador to India and Mongolia. He is a former member of the national coordination committee of the Union of Democratic Forces.

Edvin Sugarev was elected to the Bulgarian Parliament (Great National Assembly) in 1991.

References

1953 births
Living people
Politicians from Sofia
20th-century Bulgarian poets
Bulgarian male poets
Sofia University alumni
Union of Democratic Forces (Bulgaria) politicians
Ambassadors of Bulgaria to India
Ambassadors of Bulgaria to Mongolia
Diplomats from Sofia
Writers from Sofia